Gianturco is a train and rapid transit station in Naples. It takes its name from Via Gianturco, the city's industrial area. The platforms are on a viaduct.

From here, the trains passing through the railway link (now only underground line 2) could reach the lines for Cassino and Salerno. The few metropolitan trains in daily regional service (3 every day) for Caserta use the line for Cassino, while those for Salerno use the bar for Salerno.

The station was activated on May 12, 1927, as a simple stop and was originally called "Via Gianturco." An earlier proposal would have named the station  "Pasconcello"

The station has two platforms and four tracks.

References

External links 

Railway stations in Naples
Railway stations in Italy opened in the 21st century